Wishbone's Dog Days of the West is a PBS feature-length telefilm that aired on March 13, 1998. It was shot in Galisteo and Santa Fe, New Mexico.  The film was aired on PBS stations on March 13, 1998 and released to video on June 9, 1998. It is the first and only TV movie in the Wishbone franchise.

Plot
It starts out with Joe and Wishbone going to the Summer Carnival. Melina and the Oakdale Glee Club are singing on stage; the wiring breaks, causing the stage lights to collapse, but not before Wishbone and Wanda save the children. The reporter "congratulates" her. Then, in the Wild West, Long Bill Longley and his best friend, Tom Merwin (Brent Anderson), team up to stop a villain named Calliope Catesby. Meanwhile, the same sneaky TV reporter tries to make Wanda Gilmore (Angee Hughes) seem as if she is the town tyrant. It is up to Wishbone and his friends to come to Wanda's rescue.

Cast

Main cast 
 Soccer as Wishbone (Larry Brantley as the voice of Wishbone)
 Jordan Wall as Joseph "Joe" Talbot
 Mary Chris Wall as Ellen MacWilliam Talbot
 Christie Abbott as Samantha "Sam" Kepler
 Bob Reed as Walter Kepler
 Angee Hughes as Wanda Gilmore
 Paul English, Jr. as Marcus Finch
 Mikaila Enriquez as Melina Finch
 Steve Kavner as Mitchell "Mitch" McCain
 Sean McGraw as Mr. Leon King
 Lewis Barnett Finnagan III as Hank Dutton
 Jim Ponds as Ethan Johnstone
 Julio Cedillo as Travis Del Rio
 Constance Jones as Helen Davidson
 Adam Sanchez as Dan Bloodgood
 Adair Ahrens as Ginny
 Raphael Parry as Giles Gilmore
 Todd Terry as Abel Skeleton
 Dell Johnson as Lee Johnstone

Wild West Story Cast 
 Wishbone as Long Bill Longley
 Brent Anderson as Tom Merwin
 Sally Nystuen Vahle as Mame Dugan
 Mark Walters as Calliope Catesby
 Matthew Tompkins as Marshall Buck
 Akin Babatunde as Coop
 Molly McClure as Mrs. Catesby, Calliope's Mother
 Marc Mouchet as George
 Ray Reinhardt as The Magistrate
 Brennan Leverenz as Ed Merwin
 William Lawrence Allen as William Porter (O'Henry)

Reception
The movie won a Daytime Emmy for Outstanding Art Direction/Set Decoration/Scenic Design in 1998. It was nominated for a Daytime Emmy for Outstanding Costume Design/Styling, Outstanding Directing in a Children's Special, and Outstanding Main Title Design in 1999. A Common Sense Media review says, "The pleasing visuals and fast-moving, double-trouble plots make Dog Days of the West one of the best in the Wishbone series. The value of friendship is emphasized in this episode; the show exposes children to O. Henry's short stories and infuses the traditional western with an updated perspective. As unlikely as it seems, Wishbone's wild west fable blends nicely with the contemporary story of a TV reporter running roughshod over one of Oakdale's finest citizens. With two fast moving plots, finely drawn characters and exciting historical visuals, Dog Days of the West will keep kids, and many adults, glued to the screen".

References

External links
 

American children's films
American television films
1998 television films
1998 films
Films about Native Americans
Adaptations of works by O. Henry
Mattel Creations films
1990s American films